The following is a timeline of the presidency of John F. Kennedy from January 1, 1962, to December 31, 1962.

January 
 January 11 – Kennedy delivers his second State of the Union address.

February 

 February 12 – As Commander-in-chief, Kennedy commutes the military death sentence of seaman Jimmie Henderson to life imprisonment, marking the last time in the 20th century that an American president was faced with such a decision (the most recent such decision was when President George W. Bush decided to deny clemency to Private Ronald A. Gray).
 February 20 – John Glenn, aboard the space capsule Friendship 7, is launched into an orbital spaceflight by a Mercury-Atlas 6 rocket and becomes the first American to orbit the Earth.

March 
 March 22 – Kennedy signs into law HR5143, abolishing the mandatory death penalty for first degree murder in the District of Columbia, the only remaining jurisdiction in the United States with a mandatory death sentence for first degree murder, replacing it with life imprisonment with parole if the jury could not decide between life imprisonment and the death penalty, or if the jury chose life imprisonment by a unanimous vote. The death penalty in the District of Columbia has not been applied since 1957, and has now been abolished.

April

May 
 May 1 – Kennedy signs the Educational Television Facilities Act into law, marking the first time Congress provided major federal aid to public broadcasting.
 May 19 – Marilyn Monroe sings Happy Birthday, Mr. President to President Kennedy in Madison Square Garden as part of the President's 45th birthday celebrations (his birthday was on May 29).

June 
June 29 – July 1 – Kennedy makes the fifth international trip of his presidency, travelling to Mexico City, Mexico, for a state visit. There he meets with Mexican President Adolfo López Mateos.

July 
July 4 – Kennedy delivers an address at Independence Hall, Philadelphia, Pennsylvania, in which he speaks of the new movement toward interdependence that is transforming the world, and noting that the spirit of that new effort is the same spirit which gave birth to the American Constitution.
July 10 – President Kennedy attends the All Star baseball game at D.C. Stadium, and throws out the first pitch.

August

September 

 September 12 – Kennedy delivers a speech at Rice University on the subject of the nation's plans to land humans on the Moon. Kennedy announces his continued support for increased space expenditures, saying "we choose to go to the Moon in this decade and do the other things, not because they are easy, but because they are hard."

October 
 October 22 – In a televised address, Kennedy announces the October 14 discovery of Soviet missiles in Cuba, making public the Cuban Missile Crisis.  Kennedy also announces a naval "quarantine on all offensive military equipment" to that country.

November 
 November 6 – The 1962 elections are held. The Democrats lose seats in the House to Republicans, but maintain their majority; they increase their majority in the Senate. Kennedy's brother Ted wins a special election in Massachusetts to represent the state as junior senator, in the seat his brother had held prior to his election as president.
 November 22 – Kennedy is presented with the Laetare Medal by Rev. Theodore Hesburgh, the president of the University of Notre Dame. The Medal, annually awarded by Notre Dame, is considered the highest award for American Catholics. Kennedy was presented with the award in the Oval Office, by Fr. Hesburgh, who was also a member of the United States Commission on Civil Rights, and the Rev. Edmund P. Joyce, the university's executive vice president.

December 

 December 12 – President Kennedy meets with President Jorge Alessandri of the Republic of Chile to have a working meeting to discuss the Alliance for Progress.
December 18–21 – Kennedy makes the sixth international trip of his presidency, travelling to Nassau, The Bahamas, where he confers with British Prime Minister Harold Macmillan and concludes an agreement on nuclear defense systems.
 December 25 – President and Mrs. Kennedy attend mass at St. Ann's Church in Palm Beach, Florida. The Kennedys later hold a party for members of the Secret Service and their families.

See also

 Timeline of the John F. Kennedy presidency, for an index of the Kennedy presidency timeline articles

References

External links 
 Miller Center Kennedy Presidential Timeline

1962 in the United States
1962